Dmitry Aleksandrovich Yakovlevsky (born 9 May 1988) is a Russian former football forward and creative director of the design studio "Yakovlevsky Studio".

Career
Dmitry Yakovlevsky with his parents moved from Moscow to Antwerp, Belgium at the age of three and obtain Belgian citizenship.

He played for several youth teams, including Belgian Germinal Beerschot and Red Star Waasland as well as Italian Hellas Verona. He signed for Hellas Verona in January 2007 and made his professional debut for them in Italian Serie C1/A in 2007–2008 season.

In February 2009 Yakovlevsky signed for AGOVV Apeldoorn of Dutch Eerste Divisie after a successful trial.
He returned to Russia and signed for First Division team Vityaz Podolsk during the 2009 season summer transfer window. He was released after the end of season and has since returned to Belgium to play for R.F.C. de Liège and K.M.S.K. Deinze, both of Belgian Third Division.

In 2019 he founded his own design studio "Yakovlevsky Studio", which develops and organizes unique events, installations, shows and concerts. The studio organized concerts for such artists as Dima Bilan, Eldzhey, shot a video for Morgenstern and produced various events.

References

External links
  Profile at stats.sportbox.ru
 
  Profile at tuttocalciatori.net

Russian footballers
1988 births
Living people
Russian expatriate footballers
Expatriate footballers in Italy
Expatriate footballers in the Netherlands
Expatriate footballers in Belgium
K.M.S.K. Deinze players
FC Vityaz Podolsk players
Association football forwards